This is a list of episodes of the Super Sentai parody series Unofficial Sentai Akibaranger. All episode titles in Season 1 use variations of the kanji  generally read as ita, usually translated as "pain", and is related to the otaku phenomenon of the itasha. Several episode titles reference past Super Sentai titles. Examples include episode 2, with the word "Full Blast" referencing Tokusou Sentai Dekaranger, and episode 3, with the word "" referencing GoGo Sentai Boukenger. The episode titles in Season Tsuu have the word . The first season aired from April 6 to June 29, 2012 and the second season aired from April 5, 2013 to June 28, 2013.

Episodes

Season 1
<onlyinclude>

Season 2
{|class="wikitable" width="98%"
|-
! width="4%" | # !! Title !! Writer !! Original air date
|-
| colspan="5" bgcolor="#CCF"|
|-
|}

References

Unofficial Sentai Akibaranger